The Broken Silence is a feature length 1922 American film. It is an adaptation of a James Oliver Curwood novel. It was directed by Dell Henderson. It was a Pine Tree Pictures production distributed by Arrow Film Corp. A melodrama love story involving a murder and devoted siblings, it is set in Canada's northwest. Thomas F. Fallon adapted the screenplay.

Cast
 Zena Keefe as Jeanne Marat
 Robert Elliott as Bruce Cameron
 J. Barney Sherry as Inspector Brandt
 Jack Hopkins as Pierre Marat
 Jack Drumier as Indian Joe

References

Bibliography
 Munden, Kenneth White. The American Film Institute Catalog of Motion Pictures Produced in the United States, Part 1. University of California Press, 1997.

1922 films
Arrow Film Corporation films
American drama films
Melodrama films
Films directed by Dell Henderson
1920s English-language films
1920s American films